, better known by her stage name  is a Japanese singer and fashion model from Tokyo.

Biography
Luna Haruna was interested in anime and music from a young age. In her first year of junior high school, she became obsessed with Gothic Lolita manga characters, and started to collect Western clothes. In her third year of junior high school, she auditioned for the Internet radio program of Rental Magica, and was selected to perform the opening theme. She became popular as an imoto-kei amateur model in the fashion magazine Kera when she was in her second year of high school, and also did tie-in modelling for Marui. She gained popularity when she became a finalist at the fourth All-Japan Anime Song Grand Prix.

In an interview with Japanese entertainment website Nihongogo, Luna shares her inspiration behind her career "In terms of TV and anime, I grew up watching and singing the songs from Sailor Moon. As for music artists, I was really inspired by Chiaki Ishikawa and also ALI PROJECT. When I watched them perform, I was really amazed by the power of music and song. This really inspired me to become a musician and an artist."

Career
Haruna started singing full-time in 2011, and released her debut single  on May 2, 2012, which is used as the second ending theme to the 2011 anime series: Fate/Zero. Her second single, "Overfly", released on November 28, 2012, was used as the second ending theme to the 2012 anime series Sword Art Online. Her song "Startear" was used as the first ending theme to Sword Art Onlines sequel Sword Art Online II, while  was used in the video game Sword Art Online: Lost Song. She also covered the song "Kisaragi Attention" in the 2014 anime series Mekakucity Actors. On January 28, 2015, her seventh single "Kimi-iro Signal" was used as opening theme to Saekano: How to Raise a Boring Girlfriend. Her eighth single "Ripple Effect" was used as ending theme of anime High School Fleet. Her ninth single, "Windia", that released on October 12, 2016, serves as the opening theme of the game Sword Art Online: Hollow Realization.

On Haruna's mini album SxW EP on February 22, 2017, she collaborated with Kotoko, Haruka Tomatsu, Rika Mayama, Sachika Misawa, and Akira from Disacode. The song that she made with Kotoko, "SxW -Soul World-", is used as the theme song of the game Accel World vs. Sword Art Online: Millennium Twilight.

Haruna moved to the Sacra Music record label under Sony Music Entertainment Japan in April 2017. Her tenth single "Stella Breeze" that released on May 3, 2017, is used as the opening theme to anime Saekano: How to Raise a Boring Girlfriend Flat. Her third studio album "Lunarium" was released on June 21, 2017. Her eleventh single  was released on November 8, 2017; the song was used as the ending theme of 2017 anime series Urahara, in which she also made her debut as a voice actor. A special single "Justice" was released on June 7, 2018; the song is used as the opening theme to the game Fate/Extella Link. Her twelfth single, was released digitally on July 29, 2018, and received a physical release on August 22, 2018; the song is used as the opening theme to anime Yuuna and the Haunted Hot Springs. She released her first "best of" album Luna Joule on November 7, 2018: it included an orchestra version of "Overfly", which was released digitally on October 7, 2018. She released a limited edition digital single titled  on June 7, 2019. She released her third mini album "Glory Days" on October 23, 2019; the title track is used as the theme song to anime movie Saekano: How to Raise a Boring Girlfriend the Movie: Finale. The album also contains her previous single and her cover song from the anime series itself. Her Thirteenth single "Peace!!!" was released on March 18, 2020; the song was used as the sixth ending song of anime Puzzle & Dragon.

Haruna left Sacra Music label at the end of September 2021 after her contract expired.

On May 5, 2022, she released her first digital single "BLUE ROSE" as independent singer. The song was used as a character song for Cordie from the mobile game Memento Mori.

Filmography

Television animation
Urahara (2017) as Rito Suda

Live action
Movie
Aru Zombie Shoujo no Sainan (2013) as Alma V

Discography

Albums

Best albums

Digital best albums

Mini albums

Singles

Digital singles

References

External links
 

1991 births
Living people
Japanese women pop singers
Japanese female models
21st-century Japanese singers
Anime musicians
Sacra Music artists
Singers from Tokyo
Sony Music Entertainment Japan artists
21st-century Japanese women singers
Models from Tokyo Metropolis